Arachnocampa luminosa (Skuse, 1891), commonly known as New Zealand glowworm or simply glowworm, is a species of fungus gnat endemic to New Zealand. The larval stage and the imago produce a blue-green bioluminescence. The species is known to dwell in caves and on sheltered banks in native bush where humidity is high. Its Māori name is titiwai, meaning "projected over water".

The first written record of the species dates from 1871 when it was collected from a gold mine in New Zealand's Thames region. At first it was thought to be related to the European glowworm beetle (Lampyris noctiluca) but, in 1886, a Christchurch teacher showed it was a larva of a gnat, not a beetle. The species was first formally described in 1891 with the species name Bolitiphila luminosa and was assigned to the family Mycetophilidae. In 1924, it was placed within a new genus of its own, Arachnocampa, because the wing venation of the adults and the behaviour of the larvae differed significantly from other Bolitophila fly species. It was given the genus name (meaning "spider-worm") on the basis of its building a silk nest and using silk threads to capture prey.

Distribution
Arachnocampa luminosa is widespread in both the North and the South Island of New Zealand although populations generally occur in cave systems and in native bush where prey species are available and humidity is high. Some sites have become popular destinations for tourists wanting to see the glowworms. These include the caves in Waitomo, Waipu, Inglewood and Te Anau, and also in areas of native vegetation such as the Wellington Botanical Gardens.

Life cycle 

The spherical eggs (0.75mm in diameter) are usually deposited directly onto the cave wall. Upon hatching, the cylindrical larva immediately begins to glow. When they first emerge they are usually between 3 and 5 millimeters long, and will grow to between 30 and 40mm across several months. The larva may move around on the surface of the cave or bank before selecting a site to begin producing its silk nest. Most larvae emerge during the spring.

The larva spins a nest out of silk on the ceiling of the cave and then hangs down up to 30 silk threads along which it regularly places small sticky droplets. Their prey largely include other small Diptera (especially midges) although glowworm living on banks may also trap spiders and other non-flying invertebrates. When prey is entangled in a snare, the larva pulls it up by ingesting the snare and starts feeding on the prey alive.

After five larval instars, the larva will suspend itself on a long thread and pupates over up to 24 hours. The pupal phase lasts about two weeks. During this time, the pupa continue to glow although males eventually lose their glow. The adults which eventually emerge are poor fliers. Adults usually emerge during the winter and tend to live for up to 76 hours in the case of females and up to 96 hours in the case of males.  Females usually lay over 100 eggs and eggs usually hatch after about 20 days.

Sources of mortality for glowworms include predation by cave harvestmen (including the short-legged harvestmen, Hendea myersi cavernicola, and the long-legged harvestmen, Megalopsalis tumida), parasitic fungi (Tolypocladium sp.), and possibly cannibalism when adults become entangled in other larvae's silk threads although evidence is mixed.

Behavior and Ecology 
This luminescent species resides in dark, cool and damp places such as caves and their diet is predatory, they use their bluish green glow to lure in their prey. Compared to other caves the Temperature and Humidity inside the Glowworm Cave are atypical. When comparing climatic data from 1977–80 and 1955 it is shown that the cave was more stable in 1955 than it is now, this increase in climatic variability is thought to be due to the fact that in 1975 the entrance was unblocked forcing the cave to behave as a wind tunnel.

The behavior observed of both the pupae and adult New Zealand glowworm has shown that the longest stage that the Arachnocampa goes through is its larval stage which can last up to a year. Females of the A. Luminosa are the ones that are actually luminescent but it is still unknown whether or not the female's light is what attracts a male opposed to pheromones, especially when it could possibly be both. Their eyes are designed to function well with the spectral range that covers UV to green wavelengths, adult A. Luminosa are not very good fliers and they only live for a few days, on top of that they do not feed either.

Bioluminescence 
The larvae of this species glow to attract prey into their threads. The glow has a maximum wavelength of 487 nm and, like other species exhibiting bioluminescence, this glow is produced as a result a luciferase enzyme acting upon a small molecule of luciferin. It occurs in modified excretory organs known as Malpighian tubules in the abdomen. The luciferase enzyme in this species shares similarities with the protein that occurs in fireflies. However, the luciferin that the enzyme acts upon is entirely different to that of fireflies and, indeed, other currently known bioluminescent systems.

The pupae and adults of this species also produce light although the purpose is not clear. One suggestion has been that the light allows adult males to find potential mates. However, there is little evidence to support this. It is possible that the bio-luminescence in adults is simply a carry-over from the larval form because the Malpighian tubules are unaffected during metamorphosis.

References

Further reading

 The Glow-Worm, Ormiston Walker and Judy Kerdel, MacMillan New Zealand, 1990, . (A children's book.)
 Glowworm article, Encyclopædia Britannica, 15th edition
Broadley, R. A. and Stringer, I.A.N. (2009) Larval behaviour of the New Zealand glowworm, Arachnocampa luminosa (Diptera: Keroplatidae), in bush and caves. In: V.B. Meyer-Rochow (Ed.), Bioluminescence in Focus - A Collection of Illuminating Essays (pp. 325–355). Research Signpost. Kerala.

External links 

 Arachnocampa luminosa discussed on RNZ Critter of the Week, 20 July 2018
 Soil Bugs - An illustrated guide to the New Zealand invertebrates
 Glowworm article in the Encyclopaedia of New Zealand 1966
 Glowworms page (Archived 2009-10-25)

Keroplatidae
Diptera of New Zealand
Insects of Australia
Bioluminescent insects
Cave insects
Insects described in 1891